Filip Novotný (born May 6, 1991) is a Czech professional ice hockey goaltender currently with HC Energie Karlovy Vary in the Czech Extraliga. He made his professional debut during the 2010–11 Czech Extraliga season.

References

External links 
 

1991 births
Living people
Czech ice hockey goaltenders
Metallurg Novokuznetsk players
HC Sparta Praha players
Sportspeople from Jihlava
Czech expatriate ice hockey players in Russia